Mettray is a commune in the Indre-et-Loire department in central France. The Mettray Penal Colony was opened there in 1839.

Population
The inhabitants are called Mettrayens.

See also
Communes of the Indre-et-Loire department

References

Communes of Indre-et-Loire